Reza Mohammadi Langroudi (3 August 1928 – 5 March 2020) was an Iranian Twelver Shi'a cleric of the rank of Ayatollah. He served as representative of the Iranian Supreme Leader Ali Khamenei in the town of Langroud.

Reza Mohammadi Langroudi was a student of Hossein Borujerdi, Ruhollah Khomeini and Mohammad-Taqi Bahjat Foumani.

During the 1979 Islamic Revolution, he played an influential role in the marches. For a time, he was the temporary Friday imam of Langroud and Amlash.

Langroudi died at the age of 91 as a result of coronavirus disease 2019 (COVID-19) on 5 March 2020.

See also 

 List of Ayatollahs

References

1928 births
2020 deaths
Iranian ayatollahs
People from Gilan Province
Deaths from the COVID-19 pandemic in Iran